Asai or ASAI may refer to:

Asai (surname), a Japanese surname
Asai clan or Azai clan, a line of daimyō (feudal lords) during Japan's Sengoku period based in Ōmi Province
Asai moonsault, a professional wrestling move
Average Service Availability Index, a reliability index for electric power utilities
American Society of Architectural Illustrators, a professional organization representing the business and artistic interests of architectural illustrators
Advertising Standards Authority for Ireland, the self-regulatory organisation for the advertising industry in Ireland
Associazione per gli Studi Africani in Italia, the academic society of Africanists in Italy

See also 
 Acai, a palm tree used for its fruit and hearts of palm